Trevor Sorrell is a former Australian rules footballer who played for Port Adelaide in the South Australian National Football League (SANFL) and Clarence in the Tasmanian State League (TSL).

References

Possibly living people
Port Adelaide Football Club (SANFL) players
Port Adelaide Football Club players (all competitions)
Clarence Football Club players
Clarence Football Club coaches
William Leitch Medal winners
Year of birth missing
Australian rules footballers from South Australia
Australian rules footballers from Tasmania